Not Reconciled is a 1965 West German drama film directed by Jean-Marie Straub. It has the subtitle Only Violence Helps Where Violence Reigns. The film is an adaptation of the 1959 novel Billiards at Half-past Nine by Heinrich Böll.

Reception
Richard Brody of The New Yorker reviewed the film in 2008: "Straub and Huillet make the layers of history live in the present tense, which they judge severely. The tamped-down acting and the spare, tense visual rhetoric suggest a state of moral crisis as well as the response—as much in style as in substance—that it demands."

References

External links
 

1960s avant-garde and experimental films
1965 drama films
1965 films
Films based on German novels
Films based on works by Heinrich Böll
Films directed by Jean-Marie Straub and Danièle Huillet
German avant-garde and experimental films
German drama films
1960s German-language films
West German films
Films set in Cologne
1960s German films